Visitors to the Democratic Republic of the Congo must obtain a visa from one of the Democratic Republic of the Congo diplomatic missions unless they come from a visa exempt country, a country whose nationals can obtain a visa on arrival or eligible to obtain an e-visa online https://evisa.gouv.cd or are arriving from a country with no embassy, in which case they can obtain a visa confirmation followed by a 7-day visa on arrival (extendable in the DRC). In recent years, it is possible to arrange a tourist visa for visiting the Virunga National Park (on the Eastern Border) through the park itself. 

Visitors requiring a visa need to submit a legalised letter of invitation from a DRC person or organization. For tourists, a hotel booking confirmation is accepted in case the traveller has no contact in the DRC.

Visa policy map

Visa exemption 
Citizens of the following 4 countries can visit the Democratic Republic of the Congo without a visa for up to 90 days:

Holders of diplomatic or service passports issued to nationals of Angola (on duty), Iran and South Africa do not require a visa for the Democratic Republic of the Congo.

A visa exemption agreement was signed with United Arab Emirates in November 2018 and it is yet to come into force.

Visa on arrival 
Citizens of the following 3 countries can visit the Democratic Republic of the Congo by obtaining a visa on arrival valid for up to 7 days:

Other nationals arriving from a country with no DRC embassy can apply for a visa confirmation ("visa volant"). A letter of request is sent via e-mail to the Direction Générale de Migration with a photocopy of the passport of the applicant and the inviting person/organization. A confirmation is sent to the applicant which is then used to obtain a visa on arrival, valid for 7 days and extendable in the DRC.

Virunga National Park 
As tourism is growing steadily for Virunga National Park, the government has joined forces and allowed the Park to act as a facilitator in the visa process. Local tour operators can act as facilitators in the process.

See also

Visa requirements for Democratic Republic of the Congo citizens

References 

Democratic Republic of the Congo
Foreign relations of the Democratic Republic of the Congo